Caravan Publishing House (established 1997) is an Iranian publishing house which is the sole publisher of all Paulo Coelho's books in Persian and in Iran.

Overview 
Caravan Books Publishing House was established in 1997. Since then, Caravan has published many titles in fiction and nonfiction including criticism, mythology, psychology, screenplays, poetry, correspondence, pocket books, commemoration, references, etc. 
In the year 2000, Caravan invited Paulo Coelho, the famous Brazilian author, to Iran. It is alleged that he was the first non-Muslim author to visit Iran after the Islamic Revolution.
At the year 1991, Caravan presented the Paulo Coelho Literary Award and the next year, in collaboration with Andishesazan Publishing House, established the Yaldaa Literary Award, dedicated to fiction and literary criticism, which has now been presented for four years. 
In 2001, Caravan published Kaamyaab Cultural Monthly, which after five issues was renamed Book Fiesta Monthly. Twenty two issues of Book Fiesta have been published since then.

In 2004, Caravan held the first fiesta of Tirgan in Tehran, which is one of the most ancient fiestas in the world.

In 2005, Caravan Books faced an ordeal, when many of its books, especially the novel The Zahir by Paulo Coelho, were banned by the government of Iran.
In 2006, Arash Hejazi, Caravan's chief editor, was nominated to receive the IPA (International Publishers Association) Prize for Freedom of Speech.

Notes

External links
 Caravan site in English 

Book publishing companies of Iran
Publishing companies established in 1997